Makino is a Japanese machine tool manufacturing company.

Makino may also refer to:

Makino (surname), a Japanese surname
Makino clan, a Japanese clan
Makino, Shiga, a former town in Takashima District, Shiga Prefecture, Japan
Makino Station (disambiguation), multiple railway stations in Japan
Makino River, a river of New Zealand
Makino Film Productions, an early Japanese film studio